The following is a list of mountains in French Polynesia.

References

Mountains of French Polynesia
French Polynesia
French Polynesia